Rago National Park is a national park in the municipality of Sørfold in Nordland county, Norway. The park was established on 22 January 1971.

Rago borders Sweden's Padjelanta National Park, which in turn borders two other parks, and the combined of all the protected land is a total of ca. —creating one of the largest protected areas in Europe.

The lakes Storskogvatnet and Litlverivatnet lie within the park. There are several glaciers in the southeastern part of the park.  Rago National Park does not have a rich variety of plants, due partly to its poor soils and harsh climate. The wooded areas consist mostly of pine.  Many alpine plants grow among the trees.

There isn't a wide variety of animal and bird life either. Moose live in the park along with semi-domesticated reindeer. There are also wolverines in the park.  Willow grouse and golden eagles are frequently seen in the park.

Name
The name comes from the Sami name Rákkok, meaning "difficult and impassable mountain region".

References

External links
 Map of Rago National Park

National parks of Norway
Sørfold
Protected areas of Nordland
Protected areas of the Arctic
Protected areas established in 1971
Tourist attractions in Nordland
1971 establishments in Norway